Carlos Vicente Squeo (4 June 1948 in Dock Sud, Avellaneda – 8 September 2019) was an Argentine football defender. He played for several clubs in Argentina and Mexico and represented the Argentina national football team at the 1974 FIFA World Cup.

Playing career 

Squeo started his career with Racing Club in 1969, he went on to become one of the club's longest serving players, notching up 305 games and 35 goals for the club in three spells.

Squeo had a short spell with Vélez Sársfield in 1973 before returning to Racing in 1974. Later that year he was called up to play for Argentina in the 1974 World Cup, but he only made 2 appearances in the competition.

In 1977 Squeo was sold to Boca Juniors where he was part of the Copa Libertadores 1978 winning squad.

In 1979 Squeo joined (now defunct) Gallos de Jalisco in Mexico, he returned to Argentina in 1981 to play for Loma Negra.

Squeo then joined Instituto de Córdoba in 1983 before dropping down a division to try to help Racing Club to regain their status in the Primera División Argentina.

Squeo had one last spell in the Primera with Belgrano de Córdoba before spending the last years of his career playing in the lower leagues for Dock Sud and Alumni de Villa María in 1986 under manager Miguel Ángel Brindisi.

Coaching career 

Squeo served as Brindisi's field assistant for many years following his retirement as a player. He worked with Brindisi at a number of clubs including Racing Club, Boca Juniors, Independiente, Club Atlético Huracán, Club Atlético Lanús, Espanyol in Spain and the Guatemala national football team.

Honours

Player 
 Boca Juniors
Copa Libertadores: 1978

References 

1948 births
2019 deaths
Sportspeople from Avellaneda
Argentine footballers
Argentine expatriate footballers
Association football defenders
Racing Club de Avellaneda footballers
Club Atlético Vélez Sarsfield footballers
Boca Juniors footballers
CD Oro footballers
Instituto footballers
Club Atlético Belgrano footballers
Argentina international footballers
1974 FIFA World Cup players
Argentine Primera División players
Liga MX players
Expatriate footballers in Mexico